Qalat-e Pain (also Romanized as Qalāt-e Pā’īn and Qallat-e Pā’īn; also known as Kalāt-e Pā’īn) is a village in Tazian Rural District, in the Central District of Bandar Abbas County, Hormozgan Province, Iran. At the 2006 census, its population was 1,396, in 307 families.

References 

Populated places in Bandar Abbas County